Richard Kunze (5 February 1872 in Sagan – May 1945) was a German right-wing politician known for his anti-Semitism.

Early years
Kunze's political career began around 1914 when he was employed by the German Conservative Party along with fellow rightist Wilhelm Kube. Serving the party as general secretary he earned 12,000 marks per month for a role that largely involved travelling Germany drumming up support. Near the end of the war he became involved with the Fatherland Party where he gained the nickname Knüpple Kunze (Cudgel Kunze) because of strong attacks on the Jews.

Post-war activity
After the war Kunze was associated with the Deutschvölkischer Schutz und Trutzbund and in 1920 he joined with Reinhold Wulle and Arnold Ruge to form the Deutschvölkischen Arbeitsring Berlin, a short-lived successor group. The group was absorbed by the joined German National People's Party (DNVP) in June 1920 and Kunze joined the DNVP and became the party's chief publicist. However Kunze split from the party in 1921, feeling that it did not match his own hard-line stance on the Jews.

German Social Party
In 1921 Kunze established his own anti-Semitic party in north Germany known as the German Social Party, an early rival to the Nazi Party on the far right. The new party rejected the monarchism of the DNVP, arguing that Jewish influence had been just as pronounced in the German empire as in the new Weimar Republic. The party became noted for provocative street activities, with Kunze himself becoming a well-known demagogue. However support was lost as Kunze also gained a reputation for using the party as a way to make money for himself, diverting funds into his own pockets and after a number of defections he wound the party up in 1929.

Nazism
In 1930 Kunze joined his old rivals as a member of the Nazi Party. Kunze was elected to the Preußischer Landtag as a Nazi delegate in 1932, and in November 1933 he was elected to the Reichstag, serving in what by then, had become a perfunctory institution until 1945.

Kunze was arrested after the Battle of Berlin, but went missing in May 1945 and was presumed dead.

References

1872 births
1945 deaths
People from Żagań
People from the Province of Silesia
German Protestants
German Conservative Party politicians
German Fatherland Party politicians
German National People's Party politicians
Nazi Party politicians
Members of the Reichstag of the Weimar Republic
Members of the Reichstag of Nazi Germany
Leaders of political parties in Germany
People declared dead in absentia
Missing in action of World War II
German civilians killed in World War II